The Pakistan Wushu Federation is the national governing body to develop and promote the sport of Wushu in the Pakistan. The Federation was formed in 1962.

The Federation is affiliated with the Pakistan Olympic Association and Pakistan Sports Board. The Federation is the member organization of the International Wushu Federation.

National Championship
In addition to a regular event at National Games, The federation organizes National Wushu Championship annually.

References

External links
 Official Website

Sports governing bodies in Pakistan
Wushu governing bodies
Wushu in Pakistan
Sports organizations established in 1962
1962 establishments in Pakistan